The Pettengill–Morron House, or simply Morron House, is a mansion located in the American city of Peoria, Illinois. It was originally built in 1868 for Moses Pettengill, a hardware store owner who came to Peoria from New Hampshire in 1833.  When Pettengill arrived in Peoria there were 150 people, 30 log cabins and three frame houses.

The original house on the site, an 1862 construction, was destroyed by fire in 1865.  The current building was constructed in 1868 in the Second Empire style, and a colonial revival porch and porte-cochere were added in 1900.  Its original address was 464 Moss Avenue before Peoria's address renumbering in the 1950s.  The last resident was Miss Jean Morron, who lived there from 1953 until she died in 1966; the Peoria Historical Society acquired the house in 1967.

The house was listed on the U.S. National Register of Historic Places on April 2, 1976. The home is also listed as a contributing member to the West Bluff Historic District, which was added to the National Register in December 1976.

The Peoria Historical Society operates this house and the Judge Flanagan Residence as historic house museums.

Notes

External links
Pettengill–Morron House Museum

Houses completed in 1868
Buildings and structures in Peoria, Illinois
National Register of Historic Places in Peoria County, Illinois
Historic house museums in Illinois
Museums in Peoria County, Illinois
Houses in Peoria County, Illinois
Tourist attractions in Peoria, Illinois
Houses on the National Register of Historic Places in Illinois
1868 establishments in Illinois